Jere Logan Hargrove (born September 17, 1946) is a Tennessee Democratic politician who served in the Tennessee House of Representatives.

Early life and education 
Hargrove was born September 17, 1946 in Cookeville, Tennessee. He was educated at Freed-Hardeman University, receiving an associate degree in 1966; Abilene Christian University, receiving a bachelor's degree in 1969; and the University of Tennessee College of Law, where he received a J.D. degree in 1981.

Political career 
Hargrove was an assistant district attorney in Putnam County, Tennessee from 1987 to 1990.

In 1990, he was elected to the Tennessee House of Representatives, representing Putnam County, and took office the following year as a member of the 97th Tennessee General Assembly. He went on to serve eight consecutive two-year terms, from 1991 through 2006. He did not seek re-election in 2006.

He was Assistant House Majority Leader in the 98th and 99th General Assemblies and Majority Leader in the 100th and 101st General Assemblies. In the 104th Tennessee General Assembly (2005-2006), he was chairman of the House Commerce Committee.

Personal life 
Hargrove has four children and five grandchildren.

References

Living people
1946 births
Democratic Party members of the Tennessee House of Representatives
People from Cookeville, Tennessee
Abilene Christian University alumni
University of Tennessee College of Law alumni
Freed–Hardeman University alumni